= Henshin no News =

Japanese manga series

- Cover of the tankōbon volume

変身のニュース (Henshin no Nyūsu)
- Genre: Surrealism
- Manga
- Written by: Natsujikei Miyazaki
- Published by: Kodansha
- Magazine: Monthly Morning Two
- Original run: December 22, 2011 – August 22, 2012
- Volumes: 1

Henshin no News (Japanese: 変身のニュース, Hepburn: Henshin no Nyūsu; "The News of Transformation") is a Japanese anthology manga series written and illustrated by Natsujikei Miyazaki. It was serialized in Kodansha's seinen manga magazine Monthly Morning Two from May 2009 to December 2012, with its chapters collected in a single tankōbon volume.

== Publication ==
Written and illustrated by Natsujikei Miyazaki, Henshin no News was serialized in Kodansha's seinen manga magazine Monthly Morning Two from December 22, 2011, to August 22, 2012. Kodansha collected its chapters in a single tankōbon volume, released on November 22, 2012.

No.	Japanese release date	Japanese ISBN
1	November 22, 2012	978-4-06-387166-1

== Reception ==
Henshin no News was one of the Jury Recommended Works at the 17th Japan Media Arts Festival in 2013.
